The Home Owners' Loan Corporation (HOLC) was a government-sponsored corporation created as part of the New Deal.  The corporation was established in 1933 by the Home Owners' Loan Corporation Act under the leadership of President Franklin D. Roosevelt. Its purpose was to refinance home mortgages currently in default to prevent foreclosure,  as well as to expand home buying opportunities.

Since Kenneth T. Jackson's work in the 1980s, scholars have increasingly portrayed HOLC as a key promoter of redlining and a driver of racial residential segregation and racial wealth inequality in the United States.

Organizational history
HOLC was established as an emergency agency under Federal Home Loan Bank Board (FHLBB) supervision by the Home Owners' Loan Act of 1933, June 13, 1933. It was transferred with FHLBB and its components to the Federal Loan Agency by Reorganization Plan No. I of 1939, effective July 1, 1939. It was assigned with other components of abolished FHLBB to the Federal Home Loan Bank Administration (FHLBA), National Housing Agency, by EO 9070, February 24, 1942. Its board of directors was abolished by Reorganization Plan No. 3 of 1947, effective July 27, 1947, and HOLC was assigned, for purposes of liquidation, to the Home Loan Bank Board within the Housing and Home Finance Agency. It was terminated by order of Home Loan Bank Board Secretary, effective February 3, 1954, pursuant to an act of June 30, 1953.

Operations
The HOLC issued bonds and then used the bonds to purchase mortgage loans from lenders.  The loans purchased were for homeowners who were having problems making the payments on their mortgage loans "through no fault of their own".  The HOLC refinanced the loans for the borrowers.  Many of the lenders gained from selling the loans because the HOLC bought the loans by offering a value of bonds equal to the amount of principal owed by the borrower, plus unpaid interest on the loan, plus taxes that the lender paid on the property.  This value of the loan was the amount of the loan that was refinanced for the borrower.  The borrower gained because they were offered a loan with a longer time frame at a lower interest rate.  It was rare to reduce the amount of principal owed.

Loan repayments and foreclosure policies
Between 1933 and 1935, the HOLC made slightly more than one million loans.  At that point it stopped making new loans and then focused on the repayments of the loans.  The typical borrower whose loan was refinanced by the HOLC was more than 2 years behind on payments of the loan and more than 2 years behind on making tax payments on the property.  The HOLC eventually foreclosed on 20 percent of the loans that it refinanced.  It tended to wait until the borrower had failed to make payments on the loan for more than a year before it foreclosed on the loan.  When the HOLC foreclosed, it typically refurbished the home.  In many cases it rented out the home until it could be resold.  The HOLC tried to avoid selling too many homes quickly to avoid having negative effects on housing prices. Ultimately, more than 800,000 people repaid their HOLC loans, and many repaid them on time.   
HOLC officially ceased operations in 1951, when its last assets were sold to private lenders.  HOLC was only applicable to nonfarm homes, worth less than $20,000. HOLC also assisted mortgage lenders by refinancing problematic loans and increasing the institutions' liquidity. When its last assets were sold in 1951, HOLC turned a small profit.

Redlining
HOLC is often cited as the originator of mortgage redlining. HOLC maps generated during the 1930s to assess credit-worthiness were color-coded by mortgage security risk, with majority African-American areas disproportionately likely to be marked in red indicating designation as "hazardous." These maps were made as part of HOLC's City Survey project that ran from late 1935 until 1940. Perhaps ironically, HOLC had issued refinancing loans to African American homeowners in its initial "rescue" phase before it started making its redlining maps. The racist attitudes and language found in HOLC appraisal sheets and Residential Security Maps created by the HOLC gave federal support to real-estate practices that helped segregate American housing throughout the 20th century.

The effects of redlining, as noted in HOLC maps, endures to the present time. A study released in 2018 found that 74 percent of neighborhoods that HOLC graded as high-risk or "hazardous" are low-to-moderate income neighborhoods today, while 64 percent of the neighborhoods graded "hazardous" are minority neighborhoods today. “It’s as if some of these places have been trapped in the past, locking neighborhoods into concentrated poverty,” said Jason Richardson, director of research at the NCRC, a consumer advocacy group. 

A 2020 study in the American Sociological Review found that HOLC led to substantial and persistent increases in racial residential segregation. A 2021 study in the American Economic Journal found that areas classified as high-risk on HOLC maps became increasingly segregated by race during the next 30–35 years, and suffered long-run declines in home ownership, house values, and credit scores.

According to a paper by economic historian Price V. Fishback and three co-authors, issued in 2021, the blame placed on HOLC is misplaced. Far from "ironically" issuing a few loans to African-Americans in an "initial phase" and then becoming a major promoter of redlining, HOLC actually refinanced mortgage loans for African-Americans in near proportion to the share of African-American homeowners. The pattern of loans had basically no relationship to the "redlining" maps because the program to create the maps did not even begin until after 90% of HOLC refinancing agreements had already been concluded. The HOLC did share their maps with the other major New Deal housing program, the Federal Housing Administration, but FHA already had its own discriminatory program of systematically rating urban neighborhoods and there is little evidence that the HOLC maps influenced it. As for private lenders, though Kenneth T. Jackson's claim that they relied on the HOLC's maps to implement their own discriminatory practices has been widely repeated, the evidence is weak that private lenders even had access to the maps. By contrast, it is well documented that private lenders understood which neighborhoods the FHA favored and disfavored; suburban greenfield developers often explicitly advertised the FHA-insurability of their properties in ads for prospective buyers. Redlining was an established practice in the real estate industry before the federal government had any significant role in it; to the extent that any federal agency is to blame for perpetuating the practice, it is the Federal Housing Administration and not the Home Owners' Loan Corporation.
A study from 2021 found that neighborhoods, where the HOLC initiated action, are likely to display a pattern of negative commonalities in their population characteristics. Long-term racial discrimination caused by the HOLC leaves lasting long-term impacts on a population's health, education, and income.

See also
 Federal Home Loan Banks

Footnotes

Further reading
 Brennana, John F. "The Impact of Depression-era Homeowners' Loan Corporation Lending in Greater Cleveland, Ohio," Urban Geography, (2015) 36#1  pp: 1-28.  
 Price Fishback, Jonathan Rose, and Kenneth Snowden, Well Worth Saving: How the New Deal Safeguarded Home Ownership. Chicago: University of Chicago Press, 2013.

External links
Records of the Home Owners' Loan Corporation from the National Archives and Records Administration
Security maps of the Home Owners' Loan Corporation for several U.S. cities 
Mapping Inequality: Redlining in New Deal America
Annual reports of the Home Owners' Loan Corporation from 1933 through 1952, included in reports of the Federal Home Loan Bank Board

1933 establishments in the United States
New Deal agencies
Corporations chartered by the United States Congress
Mortgage industry companies of the United States